Trifolium hybridum, the alsike clover, is a species of flowering plant in the pea family Fabaceae. The stalked, pale pink or whitish flower head grows from the leaf axils, and the trifoliate leaves are unmarked. The plant blooms from spring to autumn (April to October in the northern hemisphere). Originating in mainland Europe, it has become established as an introduced plant in the British Isles and throughout the temperate regions of the world.

History

Despite its scientific name, alsike clover is not of hybrid origin. The plant gets its common name from the town of Alsike in Sweden from which Linnaeus first described it. He thought it was a cross between white clover (T. repens) and red clover (T. pratense), but in this he was mistaken and it is a separate species.

Description
Alsike clover is a perennial plant with a semi-erect, sparsely branched, grooved stem, hairy in its upper regions. The leaves are alternate and stalked with small stipules. The leaves have three blunt-tipped ovate, unspotted leaflets with finely toothed margins. The inflorescence has a long stalk and is densely globose. The individual florets have a five-lobed calyx and an irregular corolla consisting of five pink petals, one upstanding "standard", two lateral "wings" and the lower two fused to form a "keel". There are ten stamens and a single carpal.

The plant can irritate skin if handled.

Distribution and habitat
Alsike clover is native to much of southern Europe and southwestern Asia, especially in mountainous regions. It is widely cultivated and used as a forage crop and for this purpose the subspecies T. h. hybridum is used and this has become naturalised further north in Europe and in other parts of the world. Its natural habitat is fields, meadows, roadsides, banks and waste ground. When added to seed mixtures, it seldom persists once the sward has closed up.

References

hybridum
Flora of Norway
Plants described in 1753
Taxa named by Carl Linnaeus